is an autobahn in Germany. It is a short branch of the A 1 north of Lübeck, sometimes called "Nordtangente Lübeck" ("Lübeck northern tangente"). It connects the A 1 with the Bundesstraße 75, which goes to the Lübeck borough of Travemünde.

Exit List

External links 

226
A226